Pavel Verbíř (born 13 November 1972) is a Czech former professional footballer who spent his entire playing career in the Czech First League with FK Teplice. Verbíř is often referred to by his nickname 'Verba'.

Career
Verbíř's first professional club was Sparta Prague in 1987. There, he did not become a first-team regular so he moved to FK Teplice in 1992. In 2007, he won the Personality of the League award at the Czech Footballer of the Year awards. He ended his professional career after the 2010–11 season.

International career
Verbíř has played 10 matches for the Czech Republic national football team scoring two goals.

Career statistics

References

External links
 
 
 Pavel Verbíř at ''FK Teplice.cz
 

1972 births
Living people
Association football midfielders
Czech footballers
Czech Republic international footballers
Czech First League players
AC Sparta Prague players
FK Teplice players
People from Mělník
Sportspeople from the Central Bohemian Region